After a year long of acting presidency, Suharto was officially sworn in as the 2nd President of Indonesia, which took place on 27 March 1968. The ceremony was held by the Provisional MPR (MPRS). The inauguration marked the beginning of the first five-year term of Suharto as formal president.

Background

Following the 30 September Movement event General Suharto assumed presidential powers to "restore" law and order which led to anti-communist purge. By February 1967, President Sukarno realized that his political career was at an end and he became concerned at cutting his losses. On 7 February, he sent a letter to Suharto saying that he was willing to hand over the running of the government to the General but also added that he would like to continue on as head of state. On 20 February 1967, Sukarno chose to relinquish all executive power to Suharto whilst still retaining his position as president.

On 12 March 1967, the MPRS agreed to withdraw its mandate from Sukarno and remove him as president. Replacing Sukarno, in the capacity of acting president (Pejabat Presiden) would be Suharto. Suharto was officially elected on 27 March 1968, to a full five-year term, in the process officially becoming President of Indonesia.

See also
Inauguration of B. J. Habibie
Inauguration of Abdurrahman Wahid

References

Suharto
Suharto